Passionfruit is a jazz vocal album by Michael Franks, released in 1983 on Warner Bros. Records. The album reached No. 4 on the Billboard Traditional Jazz Albums chart.

Covers
"Sunday Morning Here with You" was covered by Claire Martin. "Tell Me All About It" was also covered by artists such as Natalie Cole, Chris Barber, Will Downing, Gordon Haskell and Michael Lington featuring Dave Koz.

Track listing

Personnel

Musicians
 Michael Franksvocals, backing vocals (6)
 Dave Tofanialto saxophone (1)
 Eddie Danielsalto flute (1), alto flute solo (3)
 George Margealto recorder (7)
 Jon Faddis flugelhorn (1)
 Randy Breckertrumpet solo (1), flugelhorn solo (9)
 Toots Thielemansharmonica (2, 10)
 Rob Mounseyacoustic piano (1), fender rhodes (2, 3, 7-9), synthesizers, arrangements
 Pat Rebillotfender rhodes (5),acoustic piano (6) 
 Hiram Bullockguitar solo (1), guitar (4)
 Hugh McCrackentwelve-guitar string (3), tipples (3)
 Jeff Mironovguitar (1, 2, 9), classical guitar (3, 8, 10), acoustic guitar (6), d'aquisto guitar (7), electric guitar (7)
 John Tropeaguitar (5, 6, 10)
 Neil Jasonbass (5, 6, 8, 10)
 Will Leebass (1-3, 7, 9), backing vocals (1-3, 7)
 Steve Gadddrums (5, 6, 8, 10)
 Chris Parkerdrums (1-3, 7, 9), ice bells (6)
 Sue Evanspercussion (2, 5, 7, 9, 10), Salt Packets (8)
 Naná Vasconcelospercussion (3), caxixi (7), tambourine (7)
 Frank Floyd sly (9)
 Backing vocalsKacey Cisyk (2, 3, 6, 7, 9) Lesley Miller (2, 3, 6, 7, 9) Kenny Rankin (5), Hamish Stuart (1-3, 7), Astrud Gilberto (3)
 BassHomer Mensch, John Miller
 CelloJonathan Abramowitz, Warren Lash, Charles McCracken
 ConcertmasterDavid Nadien
 HarpGloria Agostini
 ViolaLamar Alsop, Judy Geist, Theodore Israel, Emanuel Vardi
 ViolinElena Barere, Lew Eley, Barry Finclair, Regis Iandiorio, Charles Libove, Jan Mullen, John Pintavalle, Matthew Raimondi, Richard Sortomme, Gerald Tarack

Support
 ArrangementRob Mounsey
 Art directionSimon Levy
 ConcertmasterDavid Nadien
 DesignLaura LiPuma
 Assistant EngineersMichael Christopher, Roger Moutenot, Arthur Payson, Maureen Thompson
 MasteringGeorge Marino
 Mixing and recordingArtie Friedman
 PhotographyBarry McKinley
 RecordingEd Rak, Marti Robertson

References

Michael Franks (musician) albums
1983 albums
Warner Records albums
Albums produced by Rob Mounsey